The Vanderhoof Bears were a senior and intermediate ice hockey team in Vanderhoof, British Columbia. They played in the Cariboo Hockey League and the Pacific Northwest Hockey League until 1983-84. The team folded in 1984.

The name is currently used by several local teams, including a midget hockey team.

References

Ice hockey teams in British Columbia
Sports clubs disestablished in 1984
1984 disestablishments in British Columbia